Boys' dunk contest at the 2018 Summer Youth Olympics was held on 15 October 2018 at the Parque Mujeres Argentinas in Buenos Aires.

Results

Qualification

Semifinal

Final

References

External links
Qualification results 
Semifinal results 
Final results 

Dunk contest